Radermacher is a family name. Notable people with the name include:

Erika Radermacher, German pianist
Franz Josef Radermacher, German mathematician and economist 
Jacob Cornelis Matthieu Radermacher, Dutch botanist and author
Ludwig Radermacher, German-Austrian classical philologist

German-language surnames